Norman M. Naimark (born 1944, New York City) is an American historian. He is the Robert and Florence McDonnell Professor of Eastern European Studies at Stanford University, and a senior fellow at the Hoover Institution. He writes on modern Eastern European history, genocide, and ethnic cleansing in the region.

Career 
Naimark received all of his degrees at Stanford. He taught at Boston University, and was a fellow at Harvard University's Russian Research Center before returning to Stanford as a member of the faculty in the 1980s. Naimark is of Jewish heritage; his parents were born in Galicia.

He is a member of the editorial boards of a number of professional journals, including The American Historical Review and. The Journal of Contemporary History.

He was awarded the Officers Cross of the Order of Merit by Germany.

He may be best-known for his acclaimed study, The Russians In Germany. He wrote in a 2017 essay that genocide is often tied to war, dehumanization, and/or economic resentment. He writes, "if there weren’t other very good reasons to prevent war, the correlation between war and genocide is a good one".

Published works 

Books
 Stalin and the Fate of Europe: The Postwar Struggle for Sovereignty. (Harvard University Press, 2019).
 Genocide: A World History. Oxford University Press, 2017.
 A Question of Genocide: Armenians and Turks at the End of the Ottoman Empire. Oxford University Press, 2011 (Paperback ed. 2012). (Editor, together with Ronald Grigor Suny and Fatma Müge Göçek) 
 Stalin's Genocides (Human Rights and Crimes against Humanity). Princeton University Press, 2010.
 Fires Of Hatred: Ethnic Cleansing In 20th Century Europe (Harvard, 2001)
 The Russians In Germany: The History Of The Soviet Zone Of Occupation, 1945–1949 (Harvard, 1995)
 Terrorists And Social Democrats: The Russian Revolutionary Movement Under Alexander III (Harvard, 1983)
 The History Of The "Proletariat": The Emergence Of Marxism In The Kingdom Of Poland, 1870–1887 (Columbia, 1979)

References

External links 

 Biography of Naimark from Stanford 
 HNet review of The Russians in Germany: A History of the Soviet Zone of Occupation, 1945-1949.
 Historians to reconsider Russian occupation of Eastern Europe 
 HNet review of Fires of Hatred: Ethnic Cleansing in Twentieth-Century Europe.
 Interview with Naimark on "New Books in History."
 American Academy in Berlin
 Norman M. Naimark: Stalin and Europe, 1945–1953  – Video of a lecture given at the Zentrum für Zeithistorische Forschung in Potsdam on April 14, 2011.

21st-century American historians
21st-century American male writers
Living people
Stanford University alumni
Boston University faculty
Harvard Fellows
Stanford University Department of History faculty
Officers Crosses of the Order of Merit of the Federal Republic of Germany
1944 births
Writers from New York (state)
American male non-fiction writers
Genocide studies scholars